A. J. Mills may refer to:
 A. J. Mills (politician)
 A. J. Mills (songwriter)